Yucuaiquin is a municipality in La Unión Department of El Salvador, located on the slopes of Cerro La Cruz.

Name
Yucuaiquin is a native word derived from two roots of the Poton Language (of Lenca origin): "Yuku" which means fire and "Aykin" which means land or town; so the name can be interpreted as 'Land of Fire', according to historian Jorge Lardé y Larín.
Historically, the name has evolved: in 1549 it was known as Yncuayquín, then as Inquiaquín (1573), Yoayquín (1577), Yocoaiquín (1689) and Jucuaiquín or Yucquín.

History

Yucuaiquin is one of the Salvadoran Lenca towns, whose origins dates back to the pre-Columbian times; when the Spaniards arrived, Yucuaiquin was located in a valley called Llano Grande. The area was populated by Lenca natives. In the middle of the 16th century, Yucuaiquin had a population of around 300 inhabitants, as an annex to the parish of Ereguayquin. In 1786, it joined the San Alejo district and on June 12, 1824, the municipality was founded as part of the San Miguel Department, belonging until June 22, 1865, when it became part of the district of La Unión, in the department of the same name. On April 28, 1926, the Salvadoran legislature issued the decree by which it granted the Yucuaiquin Town the title of Villa, a distinction conferred upon them for having "acquired considerable development in agriculture, commerce and ornamentation". On February 15, 2002, by legislative decree, it obtained the title of City, for its economic growth and for having all the services and modernization necessary to deserve it. And on October 3, 2009 was instituted the Carnival of Fire.

Politics

The current Mayor is Mr. Oscar René Mendoza, an affiliate of the FMLN party. He was elected in the 2015 elections, for the 2015-2018 period; and re-elected in the 2018 elections for the 2018-2021 period.

Administrative divisions

The municipality is divided into nine cantons and the city:

City:
Yucuaiquin

Cantons:
Candelaria
Ciricuario
El Carmen
Hatillos
La Cañada
Las Cruces
Las Marías
Tepemechín
Valle Nuevo
las chacaras
El berrinche

Each canton is subdivided into caseríos (like a neighbourhood).

Culture
Spanish is the only language of Yucuaiquin. From the last Saturday of September to the 6th of October, Yucuaiquinians celebrate their "Fiestas Patronales" (Holidays) in honor of their patron saint, St. Francis of Assisi.

Sister city
 Somerville, Massachusetts

External links
 Municipal Government of Yucuaiquin - Official Facebook Page
 Asociación de Municipios del Chaparrastique
 Mi Yucuaiquín

Municipalities of the La Unión Department